Nejc Praprotnik (born 17 January 1993) is a Slovenian footballer who plays as an attacking midfielder.

Career
Praprotnik began his career with youth categories at Idrija, before moving to Gorica. In August 2010, he was on a trial at Manchester City, but nothing came of it. On 11 September 2010, Praprotnik made his professional debut for Gorica, in a 2–1 home win against Triglav Kranj.

In January 2011, Praprotnik signed a contract with Italian Serie A club Atalanta, but remained with Gorica on loan until the end of the season. In July, he travelled to Bergamo. He then played a full season for the club's youth squad.

In September 2012, Praprotnik returned to Gorica, in a loan basis. He scored his first and second professional goals on 20 October 2012, in a 4–1 home win against Aluminij.

On 26 October 2013 Praprotnik was an unused substitute for Livingston in their Scottish Championship match against Dundee. It was later revealed that he had been on trial with the club but hadn't been officially unveiled as signed. He made his debut on 15 March 2014, coming on as a first-half substitute in a 2–0 home loss against Dundee.

References

External links

PrvaLiga profile 

Livingston official profile

1993 births
Living people
Slovenian footballers
Association football midfielders
Slovenian expatriate footballers
Slovenian expatriate sportspeople in Italy
Slovenian expatriate sportspeople in Scotland
Expatriate footballers in Italy
Expatriate footballers in Scotland
Slovenian PrvaLiga players
ND Gorica players
Atalanta B.C. players
Livingston F.C. players
Scottish Football League players
Slovenia youth international footballers
Slovenia under-21 international footballers